Waltraud Schiefer (born 11 July 1979) is an Italian luger. She competed in the women's singles event at the 2002 Winter Olympics.

References

External links
 

1979 births
Living people
Italian female lugers
Olympic lugers of Italy
Lugers at the 2002 Winter Olympics
Sportspeople from Merano